Raymond Kirk may refer to:

 Raymond M. Kirk (1923–2019), British surgeon
 Raymond V. Kirk (1901–1947), American Catholic priest and president of Duquesne University